Stephen Edward Ambrose (January 10, 1936 – October 13, 2002) was an American historian, most noted for his biographies of U.S. Presidents Dwight D. Eisenhower and Richard Nixon. He was a longtime professor of history at the University of New Orleans and the author of many bestselling volumes of American popular history.

There have been numerous well documented allegations of plagiarism, inaccuracies, and sloppiness in Ambrose's writings in addition to claims that he has made about his works. However, in a review of To America: Personal Reflections of an Historian for The New York Times, high school teacher William Everdell credited the historian with reaching "an important lay audience without endorsing its every prejudice."

Early life
Ambrose was born January 10, 1936, in Lovington, Illinois, to Rosepha Trippe Ambrose and Stephen Hedges Ambrose. His father was a physician who served in the U.S. Navy during World War II. Ambrose was raised in Whitewater, Wisconsin, where he graduated from Whitewater High School. His family also owned a farm in Lovington, Illinois, and vacation property in Marinette County, Wisconsin. He attended college at the University of Wisconsin–Madison, where he was a member of Chi Psi fraternity and played on the University of Wisconsin football team for three years.

Ambrose planned to major in pre-medicine, but changed his major to history after hearing the first lecture in a U.S. history class entitled "Representative Americans" in his sophomore year. The course was taught by William B. Hesseltine, whom Ambrose credits with fundamentally shaping his writing and igniting his interest in history. While at Wisconsin, Ambrose was a member of the Navy and Army ROTC. He graduated with a B.A. in 1957. Ambrose received a master's degree in history from Louisiana State University in 1958, studying under T. Harry Williams. Ambrose then went on to earn a PhD from the University of Wisconsin–Madison in 1963, under William B. Hesseltine.

Career

Academic positions
Ambrose was a history professor from 1960 until his retirement in 1995. From 1971 onward, he was the University of New Orleans faculty, where he was named the Boyd Professor of History in 1989, an honor given only to faculty who attain "national or international distinction for outstanding teaching, research, or other creative achievement". During the 1969–1970 academic year, he was the Ernest J. King Professor of Maritime History at the Naval War College. While teaching at Kansas State University as the Dwight D. Eisenhower Professor of War and Peace during the 1970–1971 academic year, Ambrose participated in heckling of Richard Nixon during a speech the president gave on the KSU campus. Given pressure from the KSU administration and having job offers elsewhere, upon finishing out the year Ambrose offered to leave and the offer was accepted. His opposition to the Vietnam War stood in contrast to his research on "presidents and the military at a time when such topics were increasingly regarded by his colleagues as old fashioned and conservative." Ambrose also taught at Louisiana State University (assistant professor of history; 1960–1964) and Johns Hopkins University (associate professor of history; 1964–1969). He held visiting posts at Rutgers University, the University of California, Berkeley, and a number of European schools, including University College Dublin, where he taught as the Mary Ball Washington Professor of American History.

He founded the Eisenhower Center at the University of New Orleans in 1989 with, "The mission of the Eisenhower Center is the study of the causes, conduct, and consequences of American national security policy and the use of force as an instrument of policy in the twentieth century." He served as its director until 1994. The center's first efforts, which Ambrose initiated, involved the collection of oral histories from World War II veterans about their experiences, particularly any participation in D-Day. By the time of publication of Ambrose's D-Day, June 6, 1944: The Climactic Battle of World War II, in 1994, the center had collected more than 1,200 oral histories. Ambrose donated $150,000 to the Center in 1998 to foster additional efforts to collect oral histories from World War II veterans.

Writings
Ambrose's earliest works concerned the American Civil War. He wrote biographies of the generals Emory Upton and Henry Halleck, the first of which was based on his dissertation.

Early in his career, Ambrose was mentored by World War II historian Forrest Pogue. In 1964, Ambrose took a position at Johns Hopkins as the Associate Editor of the Eisenhower Papers, a project aimed at organizing, cataloging and publishing Eisenhower's principal papers. From this work and discussions with Eisenhower emerged an article critical of Cornelius Ryan's The Last Battle, which had depicted Eisenhower as politically naîve, when at the end of World War II he allowed Soviet forces to take Berlin, thus shaping the Cold War that followed. Ambrose expanded this into a book, Eisenhower and Berlin, 1945: The Decision to Halt at the Elbe (1967). Ambrose was aided in the book's writing by comments and notes provided by Eisenhower, who read a draft of the book.

In 1964, Ambrose was commissioned to write the official biography of the former president and five-star general Dwight D. Eisenhower. This resulted in a book on Eisenhower's war years, The Supreme Commander (1970) and a two-volume full biography (published 1983 and 1984), which are considered "the standard" on the subject. Regarding the first volume, Gordon Harrison, writing for The New York Times, proclaimed, "It is Mr. Ambrose's special triumph that he has been able to fight through the memoranda, the directives, plans, reports, and official self-serving pieties of the World War II establishment to uncover the idiosyncratic people at its center." Ambrose also wrote a three-volume biography of Richard Nixon. Although Ambrose was a strong critic of Nixon, the biography was considered fair and just regarding Nixon's presidency.

A visit to a reunion of Easy Company veterans in 1988 prompted Ambrose to collect their stories, turning them into Band of Brothers, E Company, 506th Regiment, 101st Airborne: From Normandy to Hitler's Eagle's Nest (1992). D-Day (1994), built upon additional oral histories, presented the battle from the view points of individual soldiers and became his first best seller. A reviewer for the Journal of Military History commended D-Day as the "most comprehensive discussion" of the sea, air, and land operations that coalesced on that day. Christopher Lehmann-Haupt, writing for The New York Times, proclaimed that "Reading this history, you can understand why for so many of its participants, despite all the death surrounding them, life revealed itself in that moment at that place." Ambrose's Citizen Soldiers, which describes battles fought in northwest Europe from D-Day through the end of the war in Europe, utilized, again, extensive oral histories. Citizen Soldiers became a best seller, appearing on the New York Times best sellers lists for both hardcover and paperback editions in the same week. During the same week, in September 1998, D-Day and Undaunted Courage, Ambrose's 1996 book on Meriwether Lewis and the Corps of Discovery, appeared on the best seller list, also. He also wrote The Victors (1998), a distillation of material from other books detailing Eisenhower's wartime experiences and connections to the common soldier, and The Wild Blue, that looks at World War II aviation largely through the experiences of George McGovern, who commanded a B-24 crew that flew numerous missions over Germany. His other major works include Undaunted Courage about the Lewis and Clark Expedition and Nothing Like It in the World about the construction of the Pacific Railroad. His final book, This Vast Land, a historical novel about the Lewis & Clark expedition written for young readers, was published posthumously in 2003.

Ambrose's most popular single work was Undaunted Courage: Meriwether Lewis, Thomas Jefferson, and the Opening of the American West (1996), which stayed on the New York Times best seller list for a combined, hardcover and paperback, 126 weeks. Ambrose consolidated research on the Corps of Discovery's expedition conducted in the previous thirty years and "synthesized it skillfully to enrich our understanding and appreciation of this grand epic," according to Alvin M. Josephy, Jr., who reviewed the book for The New York Times. Ken Burns, who produced and directed a PBS documentary on Lewis & Clark declared that Ambrose "takes one of the great, but also one of the most superficially considered, stories in American history and breathes fresh life into it."

In addition to twenty-seven self-authored books, Ambrose co-authored, edited, and contributed to many more and was a frequent contributor to magazines such as American Heritage. He, also, reviewed the works of other historians in the Journal of Southern History, Military Affairs, American Historical Review, The Journal of American History, and Foreign Affairs. He served as a contributing editor to MHQ: The Quarterly Journal of Military History, also.

Television, film, and other activities
Ambrose featured in the 1973-74 ITV television series, The World at War, which detailed the history of World War II.

He served as the historical consultant for the movie Saving Private Ryan. Tom Hanks, who starred in the movie, said he "pored over D-Day" and Band of Brothers in researching his role. Hanks also credited Ambrose's books with providing extensive detail, particularly regarding D-Day landings.

The HBO mini-series, Band of Brothers (2001), for which he was an executive producer, helped sustain the fresh interest in World War II that had been stimulated by the 50th anniversary of D-Day in 1994 and the 60th anniversary in 2004. Ambrose served as executive producer for Price for Peace, a documentary concerning the war in the Pacific theater during World War II, and for Moments of Truth, a TV documentary containing interviews with World War II veterans.

In addition, Ambrose served as a commentator for Lewis & Clark: The Journey of the Corps of Discovery, a documentary by Ken Burns. He provided commentary in twenty made-for TV documentaries, covering diverse topics, such as World War II, Lewis & Clark, and America's prominence in the 20th century. He also appeared as a guest on numerous TV programs or stations, including The Charlie Rose Show, C-Span programming, CNN programming, NBC's Today Show, CNBC's Hardball, and various programming on The History Channel and the National Geographic Channel. Ambrose's association with National Geographic stemmed, in part, from his designation as an Explorer-in-Residence by the Society.

In addition to his academic work and publishing, Ambrose operated a historical tour business, acting as a tour guide to European locales of World War II. Also, he served on the board of directors for American Rivers and was a member of the Lewis and Clark Bicentennial Council.

National World War II Museum
Ambrose's work for the Eisenhower Center, specifically his work with D-Day veterans, inspired him to co-found the National D-Day Museum in New Orleans with another historian and UNO professor Gordon H. "Nick" Mueller. Ambrose initiated fundraising by donating $500,000. "He dreamt of a museum that reflected his deep regard for our nation's citizen soldiers, the workers on the Home Front and the sacrifices and hardships they endured to achieve victory." He secured large contributions from the federal government, state of Louisiana, Tom Hanks, Steven Spielberg, and many smaller donations from former students, who answered a plea made by Ambrose in the New Orleans Times-Picayune. In 2003, Congress designated the museum as "America's National World War II Museum," acknowledging an expanded scope and mission for the museum. "The Stephen E. Ambrose Memorial Fund continues to support the development of the museum's Center for Study of the American Spirit, its educational programs and oral history and publication initiatives."

Awards
In 1997, Ambrose received the St. Louis Literary Award from the Saint Louis University Library Associates. In 1998, he received the National Humanities Medal. In 1998, he was awarded the Samuel Eliot Morison Prize for lifetime achievement given by the Society for Military History. In 1998, he received the Golden Plate Award of the American Academy of Achievement. In 2000, Ambrose received the Department of Defense Medal for Distinguished Public Service, the highest honorary award the Department of Defense offers to civilians. In 2001, he was awarded the Theodore Roosevelt Medal for Distinguished Service from the Theodore Roosevelt Association. Ambrose won an Emmy as one of the producers for the mini-series Band of Brothers. Ambrose also received the George Marshall Award, the Abraham Lincoln Literary Award, the Bob Hope Award from the Congressional Medal of Honor Society, and the Will Rogers Memorial Award.

Upon Ambrose's death, U.S. Sen. Mary Landrieu of Louisiana offered a resolution in the Senate, which received unanimous consent, saluting the "excellence of Stephen Ambrose at capturing the greatness of the American spirit in words."

Personal life, final years, and death

He married his first wife, Judith Dorlester, in 1957, and they had two children, Stephenie and Barry. Judith died in 1965, when Ambrose was 29. Ambrose married his second wife, Moira Buckley (1939–2009), in 1967 and adopted her three children, Andrew, Grace, and Hugh. Moira was an active assistant in his writing and academic projects. After retiring, he maintained homes in Helena, Montana, and Bay St. Louis, Mississippi. A longtime smoker, he was diagnosed with lung cancer in April 2002. His health deteriorated rapidly, and seven months after the diagnosis he died, at the age of 66. George McGovern, the primary focus of Ambrose's Wild Blue said, "He probably reached more readers than any other historian in our national history."

Legacy
Ambrose donated $500,000, half the amount needed, to the University of Wisconsin, to endow a chair in the name of William B. Hesseltine, Ambrose's mentor. The chair's position would focus on the teaching of American military history. When the chair became fully endowed, after Ambrose's death, it was renamed the Ambrose-Hesseltine Chair.

The Ambrose Professor of History title was established at the University of New Orleans after his death. The position is reserved for a military historian.

Each year the Rutgers University Living History Society awards the Stephen E. Ambrose Oral History Award to "an author or artist who has made significant use of oral history." Past winners include Tom Brokaw, Steven Spielberg, Studs Terkel, Michael Beschloss, and Ken Burns.

Criticism

Plagiarism
In 2002, Ambrose was accused of plagiarizing several passages in his book The Wild Blue.<ref>Williams, Robert Chadwell. The Historian's Toolbox: A Student's Guide to the Theory and Craft of History] Armonk NY: M E Sharpe Inc (2003)  pp 88-89</ref> Fred Barnes reported in The Weekly Standard that Ambrose had taken passages from Wings of Morning: The Story of the Last American Bomber Shot Down over Germany in World War II, by Thomas Childers, a history professor at the University of Pennsylvania. Ambrose had footnoted sources, but had not enclosed in quotation marks numerous passages from Childers's book."How the Ambrose Story Developed," History News Network, June 2002.

Ambrose asserted that only a few sentences in all his numerous books were the work of other authors. He offered this defense:

A Forbes investigation of his work found cases of plagiarism involving passages in at least six books, with a similar pattern going all the way back to his doctoral dissertation. The History News Network lists seven of Ambrose's more than 40 works—The Wild Blue, Undaunted Courage, Nothing Like It In the World, Nixon: Ruin and Recovery, Citizen Soldiers, The Supreme Commander, and Crazy Horse and Custer—contained content from twelve authors without appropriate attribution from Ambrose.

Factual errors and disputed characterizations

Pacific Railroad
A front-page article published in The Sacramento Bee on January 1, 2001, entitled "Area Historians Rail Against Inaccuracies in Book", listed more than sixty instances identified as "significant errors, misstatements, and made-up quotes" in Nothing Like It in the World: The Men Who Built the Transcontinental Railroad, 1863–1869, Ambrose's non-academic popular history about the construction of the Pacific Railroad between Council Bluffs, Iowa/Omaha, Nebraska, and the San Francisco Bay at Alameda/Oakland via Sacramento, California, which was published in August 2000. The discrepancies were documented in a detailed "fact-checking" paper compiled in December 2000 by three Western US railroad historians who are also experienced researchers, consultants, and collectors specializing in the Pacific Railroad and related topics.Graves, G.J., Strobridge, E.T., & Sweet, C.N.The Sins of Stephen E. Ambrose The Central Pacific Railroad Photographic History Museum (CPRR.org), December 19, 2000

On January 11, 2001, Washington Post columnist Lloyd Grove reported in his column The Reliable Source, that a co-worker had found a "serious historical error" in the same book that "a chastened Ambrose" promised to correct in future editions. A number of journal reviews also sharply criticized the research and fact checking in the book. Reviewer Walter Nugent observed that it contained "annoying slips" such as mislabeled maps, inaccurate dates, geographical errors, and misidentified word origins, while railroad historian Don L. Hofsommer agreed that the book "confuses facts" and that "The research might best be characterized as 'once over lightly'."

The Eisenhower controversy
In the introduction to Ambrose's biography of Eisenhower, he claims that the former president approached him after having read his previous biography of the American general Henry Halleck,
but Tim Rives, Deputy Director of the Eisenhower Presidential Center, says it was Ambrose who contacted Eisenhower and suggested the project, as shown by a letter from Ambrose found in the Dwight D. Eisenhower Presidential Library and Museum. In his response, Eisenhower stated that "the confidence I have derived from your work by reading your two books—especially the one on Halleck—give reasons why I should be ready to help out so far as I can." The Halleck biography "still sits on a shelf" at the Eisenhower National Historic Site in Gettysburg.

After Eisenhower's death in 1969, Ambrose made repeated claims to have had a unique and extraordinarily close relationship with him over the final five years of the former President's life. In an extensive 1998 interview, before a group of high school students, Ambrose stated that he spent "a lot of time with Ike, really a lot, hundreds and hundreds of hours." Ambrose claimed he interviewed Eisenhower on a wide range of subjects, and that he had been with him "on a daily basis for a couple years" before his death "doing interviews and talking about his life." The former president's diary and telephone records show that the pair met only three times, for a total of less than five hours. Rives has stated that interview dates Ambrose cites in his 1970 book, The Supreme Commander, cannot be reconciled with Eisenhower's personal schedule, but Rives discovered, upon further investigation, a "hidden" relationship between the two men. Eisenhower enlisted Ambrose in his efforts to preserve his legacy and counteract criticisms of his presidency, particularly those charging that Eisenhower's actions at the end of World War II produced the Cold War. Ambrose wrote a review and book supporting the former general, with Eisenhower providing direction and comments during the process. Rives could not square the questionable interview dates cited by Ambrose in later works, but uncovered a relationship with Eisenhower that was "too complicated" to be described by Ambrose's critics.

Works

Sole author
 Halleck: Lincoln's Chief of Staff, Baton Rouge, Louisiana State University Press (1962)
 Upton and the Army, Louisiana State University Press (1964)
 Duty, Honor, Country: A History of West Point, Baltimore: Johns Hopkins University Press (1966)

 [https://archive.org/details/supremecommander00ambr The Supreme Commander: the War Years of General Dwight D. Eisenhower, New York: Doubleday (1970)
 Crazy Horse and Custer: The Parallel Lives of Two American Warriors, New York: Doubleday (1975) 
 Ike's Spies: Eisenhower and the Espionage Establishment, New York: Doubleday (1981) 
 Eisenhower Volume 1: Soldier, General of the Army, President-Elect, 1890-1952, New York: Simon & Schuster (1983) 
 Eisenhower Volume 2: The President, New York: Simon & Schuster (1984) 
 Pegasus Bridge: June 6, 1944, New York: Simon & Schuster (1985) 
 Nixon: The Education of a Politician, 1913-1962, New York: Simon & Schuster (1987) 
 Eisenhower: Soldier and President, New York: Simon & Schuster (1990)  (a one-volume condensation of the 1983-84 two-volume Eisenhower biography)
 Nixon: The Triumph of a Politician, 1962-1972, New York: Simon & Schuster (1990) 
 Nixon: Ruin and Recovery, 1973-1990, New York: Simon & Schuster (1991) 
 Band of Brothers, E Company, 506th Regiment, 101st Airborne: From Normandy to Hitler's Eagle's Nest (1992) 
 D-Day, June 6, 1944: The Climactic Battle of World War II, New York, Simon & Schuster (1994) 
 Undaunted Courage: Meriwether Lewis, Thomas Jefferson, and the Opening of the American West, New York: Simon & Schuster (1996) 
 Citizen Soldiers: The U.S. Army from the Normandy Beaches to the Bulge to the Surrender of Germany, June 7, 1944 - May 7, 1945, New York: Simon & Schuster (1997) 
 Americans at War, Jackson: University Press of Mississippi (1997) 
 The Victors: Eisenhower and his Boys - The Men of World War II, New York: Simon & Schuster (1998) 
 Comrades: Brothers, Fathers, Heroes, Sons, Pals, New York: Simon & Schuster (1999) 
 Nothing Like It in the World: The Men who Built the Transcontinental Railroad, 1863-1869, New York: Simon & Schuster (2000) 
 The Wild Blue: The Men and Boys who Flew the B-24s over Germany, New York: Simon & Schuster (2001) 
 To America: Personal Reflections of an Historian, New York: Simon & Schuster (2002) 
 This Vast Land, New York: Simon & Schuster, (2003) 

With others
 with Richard H. Immerman, Milton S. Eisenhower, Educational Statesman, Baltimore, MD: Johns Hopkins University Press (1983) 
 with Douglas Brinkley, Rise to Globalism: American Foreign Policy since 1938, New York: Penguin Books (1997) 
 with Sam Abell, Lewis and Clark: Voyage of Discovery, Washington DC: National Geographic Society, (1998, 2002) 
 with Douglas Brinkley, Witness to America (1999) ; 2010: 
 with Douglas Brinkley, The Mississippi and the Making of a Nation: From the Louisiana Purchase to Today (2002), 

Edited works
 Institutions in Modern America: Innovation in Structure and Process, Baltimore, MD: Johns Hopkins University Press (1967)
 with James A. Barber, The Military and American Society: Essays and Readings, New York, NY: The Free Press (1972) 
 with Gunter Bischoff, Eisenhower and the German POWs: Facts Against Falsehood, Baton Rouge, LA: Louisiana State University Press (1992) 
 with Gunter Bischoff, Eisenhower: A Centenary Assessment, Baton Rouge, LA: Louisiana State University Press (1995) 
 American Heritage New History of World War II'' (original text by C.L. Sulzberger), New York, NY: Viking Press (1997)

References

Further reading

External links
 
 

1936 births
2002 deaths
American Congregationalists
American military historians
American military writers
Deaths from lung cancer in Mississippi
Dwight D. Eisenhower
Historians of the American West
Historians of the United States
Johns Hopkins University faculty
Kansas State University faculty
Louisiana State University faculty
National Humanities Medal recipients
Naval War College faculty
Official biographers to the presidents of the United States
Writers from Decatur, Illinois
People from Moultrie County, Illinois
People from Helena, Montana
Military personnel from Illinois
Writers from New Orleans
People from Whitewater, Wisconsin
University of New Orleans faculty
University of Wisconsin–Madison College of Letters and Science alumni
Wisconsin Badgers football players
Writers from Wisconsin
Historians of World War II
21st-century American male writers
20th-century American historians
21st-century American historians
Historians of the American Civil War
People involved in plagiarism controversies
American male non-fiction writers